Assane Dame Fall (born February 2, 1984) is a Senegalese sprint canoer who competed in the late 2000s. At the 2008 Summer Olympics in Beijing, he was eliminated in the semifinals of the K-1 500 m event and the heats of the K-1 1000 m events.

References
Sports-Reference.com profile

1984 births
Canoeists at the 2008 Summer Olympics
Living people
Olympic canoeists of Senegal
Senegalese male canoeists